Pandora's Toys is a compilation album released on June 8, 1994 by Aerosmith. This disc collects tracks from their 1991 box set Pandora's Box.

It was also made available in a limited-edition wooden boxed set that contains the disc covered in a red plastic jewel case, a "Story of Aerosmith" documentary CD (narrated for the English market by Chris Barrie), a sticker, a sew-on patch and a certificate. It was released in a limited number of only 10,000 worldwide, making it highly collectible.

Track listing
 "Sweet Emotion" (Steven Tyler, Tom Hamilton)
 "Draw the Line" (Tyler, Joe Perry)
 "Walk This Way" (Tyler, Perry)
 "Dream On" (Tyler)
 "Train Kept A-Rollin'" (Tiny Bradshaw, Howard Kay, Lois Mann)
 "Mama Kin" (Tyler)
 "Nobody's Fault" (Tyler, Brad Whitford)
 "Seasons of Wither" (Tyler)
 "Big Ten Inch Record" [Live] (Fred Weismantel)
 "All Your Love" (Otis Rush)
 "Helter Skelter" (John Lennon, Paul McCartney)
 "Chip Away the Stone" (Tyler, Perry, Richard Supa)

See also
Pandora's Box

Chart positions

References

1995 compilation albums
Columbia Records compilation albums
Aerosmith compilation albums